Free Baseball is a children's novel by Sue Corbett, first published in 2006.

Plot summary
Felix is a Cuban boy who came to the USA with his mother when he was three years old. He has a passion for baseball and wins two tickets to a minor league baseball game via a radio competition. Going to the game with his babysitter, they become separated when Felix learns that the opposing team has a Cuban player, believing that he might be able to share information about Felix's father, a famous baseball player on the Cuban national team who stayed behind when Felix and his mother emigrated.

Development
Corbett had the idea for the book after an incident at a baseball game, when she became separated from her daughter karina and was able to find her as all of the children were wearing the cok (the team name) team shirts.

Reception
School Library Journal described the novel as an "engaging, well-written story with a satisfying ending." The Topeka Capital-Journal called it a "wonderful mix of self-discovery and baseball." Kids Reads thought that Felix was a "richly drawn character".

Awards and nominations
2006 Selected by the Junior Library Guild
2008 Nominated for the Rhode Island Children's Book Awards
2008 Nominated for the Maryland Black-Eyed Susan Book Award
2008 Nominated for the Young Hoosier Book Award (final results not yet announced)
2008 Nominated for the Virginia Readers Choice Award (final results not yet announced)
2009 Nominated for the Nutmeg Book Award (final results not yet announced)
2009 Nominated for the South Carolina Children's Book Award (final results not yet announced)

References

External links
Official site

2006 American novels
American children's novels
Baseball novels
2006 children's books